The following is an alphabetical list of articles related to the U.S. state of New Mexico.

0–9 

.nm.us – Internet second-level domain for the state of New Mexico
4 Corners
Four Corners Monument
32nd meridian west from Washington
32nd parallel north
33rd parallel north
34th parallel north
35th parallel north
36th parallel north
37th parallel north
103rd meridian west
104th meridian west
105th meridian west
106th meridian west
107th meridian west
108th meridian west
109th meridian west

A

A Nuevo México
Acoma Pueblo website
Adams-Onís Treaty of 1819
Adjacent states:

Agriculture in New Mexico
Airports in New Mexico
Alameda Park Zoo
Alamo Bend Navajo Indian Reservation
Alamogordo, New Mexico
Alamogordo Daily News
Alamogordo Public Library
Albuquerque, New Mexico
Albuquerque International Balloon Fiesta
Albuquerque the Magazine
Aldo Leopold Wilderness
American black bear
Amphibians in New Mexico
Ancestral Puebloans (Native American)
Apache Nation (Native American)
Aquaria in New Mexico
commons:Category:Aquaria in New Mexico
Arboreta in New Mexico
commons:Category:Arboreta in New Mexico
Archaeology of New Mexico
:Category:Archaeological sites in New Mexico
commons:Category:Archaeological sites in New Mexico
Architecture of New Mexico
Art museums and galleries in New Mexico
commons:Category:Art museums and galleries in New Mexico
Artists of New Mexico
Así Es Nuevo Méjico lyrics
Astronomical observatories in New Mexico
commons:Category:Astronomical observatories in New Mexico
Atchison, Topeka and Santa Fe Railway
Aztec Ruins National Monument

B

Bandelier National Monument
Basilica of San Albino
Battle of Albuquerque
Battle of Cañada
Battle of Canada Alamosa
Battle of Cookes Canyon
Battle of Embudo Pass
Battle of the Florida Mountains
Battle of Glorieta Pass
Battle of Mount Gray
Battle of Peralta
Battle of Pinos Altos
Battle of Placito
Battle of Valverde
Biscochito
Bisti/De-Na-Zin Wilderness
Bitter Lake National Wildlife Refuge
Bizcochito
Blue Grama
Blue Range Wilderness
Bolo tie
Bosque del Apache National Wildlife Refuge
Botanical gardens in New Mexico
commons:Category:Botanical gardens in New Mexico
Bouteloua gracilis
Bridges in New Mexico
List of bridges on the National Register of Historic Places in New Mexico
Buildings and structures in New Mexico
commons:Category:Buildings and structures in New Mexico

C

Cabañuelas
Callophrys mcfarlandi
Capital of the State of New Mexico
Capitol of the State of New Mexico
Capulin Volcano National Monument
Carlsbad Caverns National Park
Carlsbad Caverns Wilderness
Carson National Forest
Casinos in New Mexico
Caves of New Mexico
commons:Category:Caves of New Mexico
Census statistical areas in New Mexico
Chaco Culture National Historical Park
Chile con frijoles
Chili pepper
Cibola National Forest
Cicuye Pueblo
Cienega affair
Cimarron Range
Cimarron River
Cnemidophorus neomexicanus
Pueblo de Cochiti website
Coelophysis bauri
Colorado Plateau
Comanche Nation (Native American)
Communications in New Mexico
commons:Category:Communications in New Mexico
Confederate Territory of Arizona, 1861–1865
Coronado y Luján, Francisco Vásquez de
Counties of the State of New Mexico
commons:Category:Counties in New Mexico
Cuisine of New Mexico
Culebra Range
Culture of New Mexico
:Category:New Mexico culture
commons:Category:New Mexico culture
Cumbres and Toltec Scenic Railroad website

D
Dams in New Mexico
Demographics of New Mexico
:Category:Demographics of New Mexico
Denver and Rio Grande Railroad
Dinétah - traditional homeland of the Diné in northwestern New Mexico

E
Economy of New Mexico
:Category:Economy of New Mexico
commons:Category:Economy of New Mexico
Education in New Mexico
:Category:Education in New Mexico
commons:Category:Education in New Mexico
Eight Northern Pueblos
El Malpais National Monument
El Morro National Monument
El Paso del Norte
El Rito Presbyterian Church
Elections of the State of New Mexico
commons:Category:New Mexico elections
Environment of New Mexico
commons:Category:Environment of New Mexico
Estado de Nuevo México
Everybody is somebody in New Mexico

F

Festivals in New Mexico
commons:Category:Festivals in New Mexico
Fiestas de Santa Fe
Films set in New Mexico
First Battle of Mora
Flag of the State of New Mexico
Forts in New Mexico
Fort Union
:Category:Forts in New Mexico
commons:Category:Forts in New Mexico
Four Corners
Four Corners Monument

G

Gadsden Purchase of 1853
Gallina
Gallinas massacre
Geococcyx californianus
Geography of New Mexico
:Category:Geography of New Mexico
commons:Category:Geography of New Mexico
Geology of New Mexico
commons:Category:Geology of New Mexico
Ghost towns in New Mexico
:Category:Ghost towns in New Mexico
commons:Category:Ghost towns in New Mexico
Gila Cliff Dwellings National Monument
Gila National Forest
Gila Wilderness
Government of the State of New Mexico  website
:Category:Government of New Mexico
commons:Category:Government of New Mexico
Governor of the state of New Mexico
List of governors of the Spanish colony of New Mexico
List of governors of the Mexican territory of New Mexico
List of governors of the U.S. territory of New Mexico
List of governors of the U.S. state of New Mexico
Great Seal of the State of New Mexico
Greater roadrunner
Grulla National Wildlife Refuge

H
Heritage railroads in New Mexico
commons:Category:Heritage railroads in New Mexico
Highway routes in New Mexico
Hiking trails in New Mexico
commons:Category:Hiking trails in New Mexico
History of New Mexico
Historical outline of New Mexico
History of slavery in New Mexico
Territorial evolution of New Mexico
New Mexico Territory
:Category:History of New Mexico
commons:Category:History of New Mexico
U.S. provisional government of New Mexico
Hopi Nation (Native American)
Hospitals in New Mexico
Hot air balloon
Hot springs of New Mexico
commons:Category:Hot springs of New Mexico

I
Images of New Mexico
commons:Category:New Mexico
Indian Pueblo Cultural Center website
Insignia of the State of New Mexico
Islands in New Mexico
Isleta Pueblo (Shiewhibak) website

J
Jemez Pueblo website
Jicarilla Apache

K
Kasha-Katuwe Tent Rocks National Monument
Keresan languages
Kiowa National Grassland
Tanoan languages

L

 La Fonda on the Plaza
La Villa Real de la Santa Fé de San Francisco de Asís, colonial capital 1610-1680 and 1692–1821, provincial capital 1621-1846
Laguna Pueblo website
Lakes of New Mexico
commons:Category:Lakes of New Mexico
Land grants in New Mexico
Land of Enchantment
Land of Enchantment lyrics
Landmarks in New Mexico
commons:Category:Landmarks in New Mexico
Languages of New Mexico
Las Cruces
Las Vegas affair
Latir Peak Wilderness
Lincoln National Forest
Lists related to the State of New Mexico:
List of airports in New Mexico
List of amphibians in New Mexico
List of bridges on the National Register of Historic Places in New Mexico
List of census statistical areas in New Mexico
List of cities in New Mexico
List of colleges and universities in New Mexico
List of counties in New Mexico
List of dams and reservoirs in New Mexico
List of forts in New Mexico
List of ghost towns in New Mexico
List of governors of the Spanish colony of New Mexico
List of governors of the Mexican territory of New Mexico
List of governors of the U.S. territory of New Mexico
List of governors of the U.S. state of New Mexico
List of high schools in New Mexico
List of highway routes in New Mexico
List of New Mexico state parks
List of hospitals in New Mexico
List of individuals executed in New Mexico
List of islands in New Mexico
List of lakes in New Mexico
List of law enforcement agencies in New Mexico
List of mountain ranges of New Mexico
List of museums in New Mexico
List of National Historic Landmarks in New Mexico
List of newspapers in New Mexico
List of people from New Mexico
List of power stations in New Mexico
List of radio stations in New Mexico
List of railroads in New Mexico
List of Registered Historic Places in New Mexico
List of rivers of New Mexico
List of school districts in New Mexico
List of state parks in New Mexico
List of state prisons in New Mexico
List of symbols of the State of New Mexico
List of television stations in New Mexico
List of United States congressional delegations from New Mexico
List of United States congressional districts in New Mexico
List of United States representatives from New Mexico
List of United States senators from New Mexico
List of valleys of New Mexico
Louisiana Purchase of 1803

M
Maps of New Mexico
commons:Category:Maps of New Mexico
Mass media in New Mexico
Matachines
Mescalero (Native American)
Mesilla, Confederate Territory of Arizona, CSA territorial capital 1862
Mi Lindo Nuevo Mexico lyrics
Missions in New Mexico
Monuments and memorials in New Mexico
commons:Category:Monuments and memorials in New Mexico
Mountains of New Mexico
Mount Taylor
commons:Category:Mountains of New Mexico
Museums in New Mexico
:Category:Museums in New Mexico
commons:Category:Museums in New Mexico
Music of New Mexico
commons:Category:Music of New Mexico
:Category:Musical groups from New Mexico
:Category:Musicians from New Mexico

N

Nambé Pueblo website
National Forests of New Mexico
commons:Category:National Forests of New Mexico
National Monuments in New Mexico
National Parks in New Mexico
National Wilderness Areas of New Mexico
National Wildlife Refuges in New Mexico
Natural gas pipelines in New Mexico
Natural history of New Mexico
commons:Category:Natural history of New Mexico
Nature centers in New Mexico
commons:Category:Nature centers in New Mexico
Navajo Nation (Native American)
Navajo people
Neomexicano
New Mexico chile
New Mexico music
New Mexican cuisine
New Mexican Spanish
New Mexico  website
:Category:New Mexico
commons:Category:New Mexico
commons:Category:Maps of New Mexico
New Mexico spadefoot toad
New Mexico State Capitol
New Mexico State Fair
New Mexico State Police
New Mexico State University
New Mexico wine
New Mexico whiptail
Newspapers in New Mexico
NM – United States Postal Service postal code for the State of New Mexico
Nuevo México

O
O Fair New Mexico lyrics
Ohkay Owingeh (O'ke Oweenge) website
Old Spanish Trail
Oñate Salazar, Juan de
Oncorhynchus clarki virginalis
Outdoor sculptures in New Mexico
commons:Category:Outdoor sculptures in New Mexico

P

Palace of the Governors
Pecos Pueblo
Pecos River
Pecos Wilderness
Pedro de Peralta
Penitentes
People from New Mexico
:Category:People from New Mexico
commons:Category:People from New Mexico
:Category:People by city in New Mexico
:Category:People by county in New Mexico
:Category:People from New Mexico by occupation
Pepsis grossa
Peralta, Pedro de
Petroglyph National Monument
Picuris Pueblo website
Pilabó Pueblo
Piñon pine
Pinto bean
Pinus edulis
Piro Nation (Native American)
Pojoaque Pueblo website
Politics of New Mexico
Popé
Protected areas of New Mexico
commons:Category:Protected areas of New Mexico
Pueblo Revival Style architecture
Pueblo Revolt
Puebloan peoples (Native American)
Pueblos in New Mexico: (Native American)
Acoma Pueblo website
Cicuye Pueblo abandoned
Pueblo de Cochiti website
Isleta Pueblo (Shiewhibak) website
Jemez Pueblo website
Laguna Pueblo website
Nambé Pueblo website
Ohkay Owingeh (O'ke Oweenge) website
Pecos Pueblo abandoned
Picuris Pueblo website
Pilabó Pueblo abandoned
Pojoaque Pueblo website
San Felipe Pueblo website
San Ildefonso Pueblo website
Sandia Pueblo (Nafiat) website
Santa Ana Pueblo website
Santa Clara Pueblo website
Santo Domingo Pueblo website
Senecú Pueblo abandoned
Taos Pueblo website
Tesuque Pueblo (Te Tsugeh Oweengeh) website
Teypana Pueblo abandoned
Zia Pueblo website
Zuñi Pueblo website
Puyé Cliff Dwellings

R

Radio stations in New Mexico
Railroad museums in New Mexico
commons:Category:Railroad museums in New Mexico
Ramah Navajo Indian Reservation
Red River Canyon affair
Religion in New Mexico
:Category:Religion in New Mexico
commons:Category:Religion in New Mexico
:Category:Religious buildings and structures in New Mexico
Rio Bravo del Norte
Rio Chama
Rio Grande
Rio Grande cutthroat trout
Rio Grande Gorge
Rio Grande Gorge Bridge
Rio Grande Railroad
Rio San Juan
Rivers in New Mexico
Rock formations in New Mexico
commons:Category:Rock formations in New Mexico
Rocky Mountains

S

Sacramento Mountains
Salinas Pueblo Missions National Monument
San Felipe Pueblo website
San Ildefonso Pueblo website
San Juan de los Caballeros, first colonial capital 1598-1610
San Juan Mountains
San Juan River
Sandia hairstreak butterfly
Sandia Mountain Wilderness
Sandia Pueblo (Nafiat) website
Sangre de Cristo Mountains
Santa Ana Pueblo website
Santa Clara Pueblo website
Santa Fé, colonial capital 1610-1680 and 1692–1821, provincial capital 1621–1846, military capital 1846–1848, provisional capital 1848–1850, territorial capital 1850–1912, and state capital since 1912
Santa Fé de Nuevo Méjico, 1692–1821
Santa Fé de Nuevo México, 1821–1848
Santa Fe Mountains
Santa Fe National Forest
Santa Fe Railway
Santa Fé Style
Santa Fe Trail
Santo
Santo Domingo Pueblo website
Scouting in New Mexico
Second Battle of Mora
Senecú Pueblo
Settlements in New Mexico
Cities in New Mexico
Towns in New Mexico
Villages in New Mexico
Census Designated Places in New Mexico
Other unincorporated communities in New Mexico
List of ghost towns in New Mexico
Siege of Pueblo de Taos
Sierra Blanca
Sierra Blanca Peak
Ski areas and resorts in New Mexico
commons:Category:Ski areas and resorts in New Mexico
Skirmish near Fort Thorn, New Mexico Territory
Smokey Bear
Soaptree Yucca
Solar power in New Mexico
Southern Pacific Railroad
Southern Rocky Mountains
Spaceport America
Spea multiplicata
Sports in New Mexico
commons:Category:Sports in New Mexico
Sports venues in New Mexico
commons:Category:Sports venues in New Mexico
State of New Mexico  website
Government of the State of New Mexico
:Category:Government of New Mexico
commons:Category:Government of New Mexico
State Police of New Mexico
State prisons in New Mexico
Structures in New Mexico
commons:Category:Buildings and structures in New Mexico
Superfund sites in New Mexico
Symbols of the State of New Mexico: website
New Mexico state aircraft
New Mexico state amphibian
New Mexico state ballad
New Mexico state bird
New Mexico state butterfly
New Mexico state cookie
New Mexico state fish
New Mexico state flag
New Mexico state flower
New Mexico state fossil
New Mexico state gem
New Mexico state grass
New Mexico state historic railroad
New Mexico state insect
New Mexico state mammal
New Mexico state motto
New Mexico state neckwear
New Mexico state nickname
New Mexico state poem
New Mexico state question
New Mexico state reptile
New Mexico state seal
New Mexico state slogan
New Mexico state song (bilingual)
New Mexico state song (English)
New Mexico state song (Spanish)
New Mexico state tree
New Mexico state vegetables

T

Taos
Taos Mountains
Taos Pueblo website
Tarantula hawk wasp
Telecommunications in New Mexico
commons:Category:Communications in New Mexico
Telephone area codes in New Mexico
Television shows set in New Mexico
Television stations in New Mexico
Territory of Arizona (CSA), 1861–1865
Territory of New Mexico, 1850–1912
Tesuque Pueblo (Te Tsugeh Oweengeh) website
Tewa language
Teypana Pueblo
Theatres in New Mexico
commons:Category:Theatres in New Mexico
Tiwa languages
Tiwa people
Tohajiilee Indian Reservation
Tourism in New Mexico  website
commons:Category:Tourism in New Mexico
Transportation in New Mexico
:Category:Transportation in New Mexico
commons:Category:Transport in New Mexico
Treaty of Guadalupe Hidalgo of 1848
Truchas Peak
Tsankawi
Turquoise
Two-needle Piñon

U
United States of America
States of the United States of America
United States census statistical areas of New Mexico
United States congressional delegations from New Mexico
United States congressional districts in New Mexico
United States Court of Appeals for the Tenth Circuit
United States District Court for the District of New Mexico
United States Representatives from New Mexico
United States Senators from New Mexico
University of New Mexico
Uranium mining in New Mexico
Ursus americanus
US-NM – ISO 3166-2:US region code for the State of New Mexico
Ute Nation (Native American)

V

Very Large Array
Viceroyalty of New Spain
La Villa Real de la Santa Fé de San Francisco de Asís
Virreinato de la Nueva España

W

Waterfalls of New Mexico
commons:Category:Waterfalls of New Mexico
Wheeler Peak
White Sands National Park
Wikimedia
Wikimedia Commons:Category:New Mexico
commons:Category:Maps of New Mexico
Wikinews:Category:New Mexico
Wikinews:Portal:New Mexico
Wikipedia Category:New Mexico
Wikipedia:WikiProject New Mexico
:Category:WikiProject New Mexico articles
:Category:WikiProject New Mexico participants
Wind power in New Mexico
Writers of New Mexico

X

Y
Yucca elata
Yucca
Yunque Yunque

Z

Zia Nation (Native American)
Zia Pueblo website
Zoos in New Mexico
commons:Category:Zoos in New Mexico
Zozobra
Zuñi Nation (Native American)
Zuñi Pueblo website

See also

Topic overview:
New Mexico
Outline of New Mexico

Index
 
New Mexico